The 2003 CHA Men's Ice Hockey Tournament was played between March 14 and March 16, 2003 at Tri-City Arena in Kearney, Nebraska. By winning the tournament, Wayne State received College Hockey America's automatic bid to the 2003 NCAA Division I Men's Ice Hockey Tournament.

Format
The tournament featured six teams. The top two teams from the regular season received byes to the semifinals where they played the winners from the quarterfinal games. The two semifinal winners met in the championship game on March 16, 2003, with the winner receiving an automatic bid to the 2003 NCAA Division I Men's Ice Hockey Tournament.

Conference standings
Note: GP = Games played; W = Wins; L = Losses; T = Ties; PTS = Points; GF = Goals For; GA = Goals Against

Bracket

Note: * denotes overtime period(s)

Tournament awards

All-Star team
Goaltender: David Guerrera (Wayne State)
Defensemen: Bryce Methven (Bemidji State), Marc St. Jean (Wayne State)
Forwards: Jason Durbin (Wayne State), Dustin Kingston (Wayne State), Barret Ehgoetz (Niagara), Andrew Murray (Bemidji State)

MVP
Marc St. Jean (Wayne State)

References

External links
College Hockey America tournament history

CHA Men's Ice Hockey Tournament
Cha Men's Ice Hockey Tournament